A prebound book is a book that was previously bound and has been rebound with a library quality hardcover binding. In almost all commercial cases, the book in question began as a paperback version.

An alternate term is "Library Hardcover Paperback".

See also
 Library binding

Book publishing